Édgar Arturo García de Dios (1 September 1977 – 27 June 2010) was a Mexican professional footballer who played as a forward.

Club career
Born in Mexico City, García made his debut with Atlante F.C. in the Mexico First Division in the 1995–96 season. He then moved to play in Toluca, and Verano. After a brief season in LASK in Second Division in Austria, he returned for season 1999–2000 to play with Tecos UAG.

Personal life
He was a son of Arturo and Margarita García. As of 2002, García did not play professional football anymore after he had become an alcoholic, effectively ending his football career prematurely.

Death
García was shot with seven bullets at close range while in a taxi cab in Naucalpan. The motives of the killing are not clear.

References

External links
 

1977 births
2010 deaths
Footballers from Mexico City
Mexican footballers
Association football forwards
Austrian Football Bundesliga players
Atlante F.C. footballers
Deportivo Toluca F.C. players
LASK players
Mexican expatriate footballers
Mexican expatriate sportspeople in Austria
Expatriate footballers in Austria
Male murder victims
Deaths by firearm in Mexico
People murdered in Mexico
Mexican murder victims